Baba Bhusandeswar Temple is located at Bhograi Block, Kumbhirgadi village of Balasore district, Odisha, India. The 12 feet long and 14 feet width lingam is carved out on a black granite and only half of the lingam is visible. The other half has remained buried for years. The lingam has three parts. The middle portion of the lingam is octagonal in shape, about 12 feet in diameter and nearly four feet in height. The Lingam slightly leans towards the right side.

Mythology
But Lord Shiva warned him not to place the Lingam anywhere. Ravana was on his way with Lingam on his Pushpak vimana(a Airway flying  vehicle). The angels or Gods were disappointed and thought to seize the power of Ravana, which he brought from Lord Shiva. In the meantime, Ravana felt desperate and planted the Linga at this place. He tried to lift again but failed because it was heavy. For a long time, the Shiva Linga was in the wild. 

It's a beautiful and powerful place to visit

References

Hindu temples in Balasore district
Shiva temples in Odisha
Balasore